A number of rivers are known to have reversed the direction of their flow, either permanently or temporarily, in response to geological activity, weather events, climate change, or direct human intervention.

Permanent reversals

Natural

Artificial

Temporary reversals

Daily
All tidal sections of rivers reverse their flow with the tide about twice a day (or semidiurnally), by definition. The following are notable examples.

Annual

Intermittent
Hurricane storm surges often cause temporary reversals of coastal rivers.

See also
Stream capture, in which a stream or river is diverted from its own bed, and flows instead down a neighboring channel

References

reversals
Hydrology
Fluvial geomorphology